Remicourt is a municipality of Wallonia located in the province of Liège, Belgium. 

On January 1, 2006, Remicourt had a total population of 5,012. The total area is 22.58 km2 which gives a population density of 222 inhabitants per km2. 

The municipality consists of the following districts: Hodeige, Lamine, Momalle, Pousset, and Remicourt.

See also
 List of protected heritage sites in Remicourt, Belgium

References

External links
 

Municipalities of Liège Province